Qumushiha (born January 1960) is a Chinese politician of Yi ethnicity who is vice chairman of the Sichuan Provincial Committee of the Chinese People's Political Consultative Conference. He was an alternate member of the 19th Central Committee of the Chinese Communist Party. He was a delegate to the 10th National People's Congress.

Biography
Qumushiha was born in Yuexi County, Sichuan, in January 1960. He enlisted in the People's Liberation Army (PLA) in December 1976, and served in the PLA 89201 Army until January 1981.

He entered politics in January 1981, when he became an official in the United Front Department of CCP Liangshan Yi Autonomous Prefecture Committee. In 1982, he was accepted to Southwest Minzu University, majoring in politics, where he graduated in August 1986. He joined the Chinese Communist Party (CCP) in June 1985. In August 1986, he was assigned to Puge County, where he eventually becoming its assistant magistrate in October 1988. In May 1989, he became deputy magistrate of Xide County, rising to magistrate in March 1990. He served as vice governor of Liangshan Yi Autonomous Prefecture in October 2002, and five months later promoted to the governor position. In December 2004, he became vice director of Sichuan Provincial Development and Reform Commission, in addition to serving as vice governor of Sichuan since September 2011. In May 2016, he was admitted to member of the Standing Committee of the CCP Sichuan Provincial Committee, the province's top authority. In February 2021, he was chosen as vice chairman of the Sichuan Provincial Committee of the Chinese People's Political Consultative Conference, the province's top political advisory body.

References

1968 births
Living people
Yi people
People from Yuexi County, Sichuan
Southwest University for Nationalities alumni
Central Party School of the Chinese Communist Party alumni
People's Republic of China politicians from Sichuan
Chinese Communist Party politicians from Sichuan
Governors of Liangshan Yi Autonomous Prefecture
Alternate members of the 19th Central Committee of the Chinese Communist Party
Delegates to the 10th National People's Congress